Oscar S. Lerman (September 7, 1919 – March 2, 1992) was an American nightclub impresario, theatre and film producer, and the second husband of British novelist Jackie Collins, from 1965 until his death in 1992, whom he persuaded to write. In 1969, he co-founded the famously exclusive members-only nightclub Tramp in London. In 1978–79, he was a producer of the films The Stud, The World Is Full of Married Men, and The Bitch, all based on his wife's books.

Early life
Oscar Lerman was born on September 7, 1919 in Philadelphia.

Career
In the 1950s, Lerman was a Broadway theatre producer in New York.

In 1968, he persuaded his wife Jackie Collins to write her first novel, The World Is Full of Married Men.

In 1969, Lerman opened the members-only nightclub Tramp in London's Jermyn Street which he co-owned with Johnny Gold and Bill Ofner. The opening night was attended by Joan and Jackie Collins, Michael Caine, Roger Moore, and Natalie Wood.

In the late 1970s he moved into films, producing The Stud (1978), The World Is Full of Married Men (1979), The Bitch (1979), and Yesterday's Hero (1979), all based on his wife's novels apart from Yesterday's Hero, for which she wrote the script.

Personal life
In 1965, Lerman married the British novelist Jackie Collins, 18 years his junior, whom he had met on a blind date.  They had two daughters together, Tiffany (born 1967) and Rory (born 1969).

Death
Lerman died from prostate cancer in Los Angeles on 2 March 1992.

Selected filmography (as producer)
The Stud (1978)
The World Is Full of Married Men (1979)
The Bitch (1979)
Yesterday's Hero (1979)

References

External links

1919 births
1992 deaths
American film producers
Burials at Westwood Village Memorial Park Cemetery
Deaths from cancer in California
Deaths from prostate cancer
People from Philadelphia
Broadway theatre producers
Nightclub owners